Gnanamuttu Sirinesan (born 1 July 1960) is a Sri Lankan Tamil politician and Member of Parliament.

Early life
Sirinesan was born on 1 July 1960. He was educated at A.T.K. School, Vavunativu and Sittandi Madhya Maha Vidyalayam. After school he joined the University of Peradeniya, graduating with a B.A. degree. He also holds a M.A. degree in politics.

Career
Sirinesan is a former deputy director of the Manmunai West Education Zone.

Sirinesan was one of the Tamil National Alliance's (TNA) candidates in Batticaloa District at the 2015 parliamentary election. He was elected and entered Parliament.

Electoral history

References

1960 births
Alumni of the University of Peradeniya
Living people
Illankai Tamil Arasu Kachchi politicians
Members of the 15th Parliament of Sri Lanka
People from Eastern Province, Sri Lanka
Sri Lankan Tamil civil servants
Sri Lankan Tamil politicians
Tamil National Alliance politicians